The Felino cB7 (stylized FELINO cB7) is a Canadian sports car produced by automotive company FELINO Cars. The car was in development for a total of seven years before its official production in 2016.

cB7
The vehicle was unveiled in the 2014 Montreal International Auto Show.

Prices will start at around US$275,000.

Development
Before its production start, the car was in development for seven years. The car was designed by Canadian racing driver Antoine Bessette.

The car started with a design blueprint to confirm its design. A year later in 2009, the car's main frame was built, which had a lightweight tubular frame, and was wrapped with composite and carbon fiber elements. The first cB7 prototype was being built in 2010, and was completed in 2011. Testing was being done in the Circuit Gilles Villeneuve track. A second prototype was built, with a larger engine and body. In 2014, an unveiling of the prototype was made in the Montreal International Auto Show. This was the same year the development of the car was in near completion. The car was officially sold in 2016.

Specifications
The car uses one of three optional 7.0-liter naturally-aspirated cast aluminum V8 engines. The car's top speed and performance figures are dependent on the option. The engine compression ratio is 10.7:1 and the bore and stroke is 103.25 x 92mm. This power is delivered by either a 6-speed manual transmission or a 6-speed sequential paddle-shift transmission. The body uses composites and carbon fiber. The car's tire sizes are 245/40R18 up front and 315/30R18 in the rear. These tires shoe the aluminum alloy standard wheels. The brakes are regular steel discs, which are  both front and rear but are 6-piston up front and 4-piston in the rear. These brake discs have optional carbon fiber.

Design
The exterior is a long nose kind of layout, with a design that slightly resembles that of lightweight track cars. The car has the inclusion of LED lighting. The car's carbon fiber diffuser gives the car more aggression. The interior design shows the lightweight track design much more boldly, with the inclusion of exposed carbon fiber and racing components. It still keeps a road car design with some leather installations.

Media
The cB7 has been featured in three games: Asphalt 8, Asphalt Nitro, Speed Racing Ultimate.

cB7R

The vehicle was unveiled in 2020 Canadian International AutoShow.

cB7+
It was planned to be the last model of the cB7 series, to be unveiled in 2020 following cB7R premiere.

References

External links
Felino Cars pages: cB7, cB7R, cB7+
Press kit: FELINO(cB7+/cB7R): English French 

Sports cars
Cars of Canada